Jaguar I may refer to:

List of Jaguar I-models

Jaguar I-Type Formula E race cars from Jaguar Racing

Jaguar street cars for Jaguar Cars
 Jaguar I-Pace (2018) all-electric battery-powered SUV
 Jaguar Mark I (1955–1959) saloon car

Other
 Armstrong Siddeley Jaguar I, aero engine

Other uses
 Jaguar 1 (RakJPz.3) West German tank destroyer

See also
 Jaguar (disambiguation)
 I (disambiguation)

I